Cow Chocolate (Shokolad Para) is a brand of Israeli chocolate products produced by the candy and coffee products manufacturer Strauss-Elite.

Cow brand chocolate was first produced in 1934 under the name "Shamnunit" (lit. creamy). Since the 1950s, the wrapping of the chocolate bar has featured the illustration of a cow, giving the product its name.

Cow chocolate is one of the company's leading products and one of the most widely sold  chocolate bar brands in Israel.

Since 2002, the Cow Chocolate brand has expanded to include chocolate spread, snacks and candy. Changes have also been made in the cow logo.

See also
 Israeli cuisine
 Bamba (snack)

References

External links
 Shokolad Para @ strauss-group.com

Brand name chocolate
Chocolate bars
Israeli brands
Israeli confectionery